Mihail Kogălniceanu is a commune in Constanța County, Northern Dobruja, Romania, located  northwest of Constanța proper. The commune includes three villages:
 Mihail Kogălniceanu  - historical names: Kara Murat, Bulgari and Regele Ferdinand
 Palazu Mic
 Piatra (historical name: Tașaul)

The commune further includes two territorially distinct communities, Social Group Sibioara and Social Group Ceres, which are legally part of the village of Mihail Kogălniceanu. The Mihail Kogălniceanu International Airport is located nearby.

History
The village is situated on the site of a Roman settlement called Vicus Clementianus, discovered by the archaeologist Vasile Pârvan in 1913.

In 1651, the place was mentioned by the Ottoman traveler Evliya Çelebi as a Tatar settlement named Kara Murat ("Black Murat", after its founder).

In 1879-1880, after the incorporation of Northern Dobruja into Romania, the village started to be settled by Romanian shepherds from Transylvania (Mocani). In the 1930s it was renamed Ferdinand I, after King Ferdinand I of Romania. In 1948, with the advent of the communist regime, the commune was given its current name, after the Romanian politician Mihail Kogălniceanu.

Demographics
At the 2011 census, Mihail Kogălniceanu had 8,273 Romanians (84.95%), 3 Hungarians (0.03%), 246 Roma  (2.53%), 3 Germans (0.03%), 33 Turks (0.34%), 419 Tatars (4.30%), 108 Aromanians (1.11%), 642 others (6.59%), and 12 with undeclared ethnicity (0.12%).

Natives
Adolph Bachmeier
Dumitru Caraman
Toma Enache (born 1970), film director
Stere Gulea
Adrian Pllotschi
Stere Sertov

References

External links
 "Romanians Eager for Long-Awaited Arrival of the Yanks", Kevin Sullivan, The Washington Post, February 6, 2006

Communes in Constanța County
Localities in Northern Dobruja
Aromanian settlements in Romania